Marquess of Castellbell is a hereditary title in the Peerage of Spain accompanied by the dignity of Grandee, granted in 1702 by Philip V to José de Amat, a Catalan nobleman who was Lord of Castellbell.

The fourth child of the 1st Marquess, Manuel de Amat y Junyent, would become one of the most important men of his time, a prominent viceroy of Peru (1761-1776).

The 9th Marquess was a prominent actor and media figure in the latter half of twentieth century Spain. In 1945, he married Essylt Priscilla Scott-Ellis, a daughter of Thomas Scott-Ellis, 8th Baron Howard de Walden. She was a descendant of the 3rd Duke of Portland, who was Prime Minister of the United Kingdom between 1807 and 1809.

Marquesses of Castellbell (1702)

José de Amat y Planella, 1st Marquess of Castellbell (1670-1715)
José de Amat y Junyent, 2nd Marquess of Castellbell (1700-1770), eldest son of the 1st Marquess
Cayetano de Amat y Rocabertí, 3rd Marquess of Castellbell (d. 1794), third son of the 2nd Marquess
Manuel Cayetano de Amat y Peguera, 4th Marquess of Castellbell (1777-1846), only son of the 3rd Marquess
Cayetano María de Amat y Amat, 5th Marquess of Castellbell (1803-1869), eldest son of the 4th Marquess
Joaquín de Cárcer y Amat, 6th Marquess of Castellbell (1835-1923), son of Manuel de Amat y de Amat, second son of the 4th Marquess
María de los Dolores de Cárcer y de Ros, 7th Marchioness of Castellbell (1867-1939), granddaughter of María Escolástica de Amat y de Amat, eldest daughter of the 4th Marquess
Salvador de Vilallonga y de Cárcer, 8th Marquess of Castellbell (1891-1974), eldest son of the 7th Marchioness
José Luis de Vilallonga y Cabeza de Vaca, 9th Marquess of Castellbell (1920-2007), eldest son of the 8th Marquess
John Alfonso de Vilallonga y Scott-Ellis, 10th Marquess of Castellbell (b. 1947), eldest son of the 9th Marquess

See also
List of current Grandees of Spain

References

Grandees of Spain
Marquesses of Spain
Lists of Spanish nobility
Noble titles created in 1702